Rajshahi District is a district in mid-western Bangladesh. It is a part of the Rajshahi Division. The metropolitan city of Rajshahi is in Rajshahi District.

Geography
Rajshahi district is bounded by Naogaon District to the north, Natore District to the east, Chapai Nababganj District to west and little part of Kushtia District & the river Padma to the south. The district consists of alluvial plain.

Rivers
There are ten rivers in this district, totaling 146 km in length.
The main river is the Padma River (Ganges). Some others are Mahananda, Baral and Barnai river.

History 
Rajshahi region was ruled by the Puṭhia Raj family based in the Puṭhia Rajbari. The Mughal Emperor Akbar had given the Rajshahi region to the Puṭhia Raj family to govern, the governor was Pitambar. The Puṭhia family was given the title of Raja by the Mughal Emperor Jahangir. Rajshahi District was established in 1772. Parts of the districts eventually became Bogura district, Malda district, Natore district, Naogaon district, Nawabganj district, and Pabna district. On 1 April 1876 Rajshahi town was made into municipal town.

During the Bangladesh Liberation War in 1971, the town was the site of battles between the Mukti Bahini and the Pakistan Army. The Pakistan Army fought a battle against the Mukti Bahini on 30 March 1971 which resulted in the death of an East Pakistan Rifles member. Between 26 and 30 March, 31 individuals in Godagaɽi upazila were killed by the Pakistan Army. On 13 April the Pakistan Army killed Rajshahi Cadet College Professor AB Siddiqi. The Pakistan Army attacked Tahirpur Haṭ in Bagmara upazila on 24 May and killed 25 people. Mukti Bahini commander Havilder Shafiq led an attack on Pakistan Army boat on 8 August killing 18 Pakistan Army personal. Pakistan Army killed two members of Bangladesh Ansar in a war of attrition. Pakistan Army established a camp in the Zoha Hall of Rajshahi University where they massacred hundreds of civilians. Pakistan Army had also established camps inside Rajshahi Cadet College, Roy Saheb brickfield, Sardaha Pilot School, and Sardah Police Academy. The Pakistan Army tortured members of Mukti Bahini and civilians in the camps. The Pakistan Army also killed hundreds of refugees on the banks of Padma river who were fleeing to India. In a fight between Mukti Bahini and Pakistan Army near Kabasmul, a Pakistan Army major was killed. Pakistan Army retaliated by killing 44 civilians in Gaganbari and Palsa. The Pakistan Army stationed in Pabna and Rajshahi districts surrendered on 18 December 1971, two days after Pakistani forces in Bangladesh signed the Pakistani instrument of Surrender in Dhaka on 16 December 1971. Pakistani military surrendered to Indian Army Captain Nanda in Naṭore. The Pakistan Army camp in Rajshahi University was taken over by Mukti Bahini members on 17 December after fighting them. Surrender ceremonies took place on 20 December.

Rajshahi town was upgraded to a municipal corporation on 13 August 1987. In 1997 the government of Bangladesh made Rajshahi town into a full city corporation, Rajshahi City Corporation. In 2016 Rezaul Karim Siddiquee, a professor at University of Rajshahi, and a 65 year old Sufi preacher, Shahidullah, were killed by Islamic extremists.

Demographics 

According to the 2011 Bangladesh census, Rajshahi District had a population of 2,595,197, of which 1,309,890 were males and 1,285,307 females. Rural population was 1,740,578 (67.07%) while the urban population was 854,619 (32.93%). Rajshahi district had a literacy rate of 52.98% for the population 7 years and above: 55.84% for males and 50.09% for females.

Muslims are the majority population. The Christian population has grown quickly, while the number of those following ethnic religions has declined significantly. Ethnic minorities were 49,312 (1.90%), mainly Santals and Oraons.

Upazilas
Sub-district or upazilas and thanas of Rajshahi are
 Bagha Upazila
 Bagmara Upazila
 Charghat Upazila
 Durgapur Upazila
 Godagari Upazila
 Mohanpur Upazila
 Paba Upazila
 Puthia Upazila
 Tanore Upazila
 Boalia Thana
 Matihar Thana
 Rajpara Thana
 Shah Makdam Thana
Chandrima Thana
Katakhali Thana
Belpukur Thana
Airport Thana
Kashiadanga Thana
Kornohar Thana
Damkura Thana

Communications

Rajshahi district has well organized internal communication as well as connection to other parts of the country. There are 96 metalled roads with a total length of about 1270 km, 108 semi-metalled roads of about 546 km length, and six railways of about 63 km total length.

Media and press club
There are many Bengali daily newspapers published from the city, including Sonali Sangbad, Sunshine, Dainik Barta, Sonar Desh, Natun Provat, and Amader Rajshahi. There are also many online news portal such as rajshahinews24.com, silkcitynews.com, Uttorbongo Protidin, GKhobor etc.

The government-run Bangladesh Television and Bangladesh Betar have transmission centres in Rajshahi.

A local FM radio station, Radio Padma, transmits at 99.2 MHz frequency and Radio Foorti transmits at 88.0 MHz.

There is also four press clubs in Rajshahi City. Known as Rajshahi City Press Club, Rajshahi Press Club, Rajshahi Metropolitan Press Club and Rajshahi Model Press Club.

Economy
Rajshahi Metropolitan is widely known as Silk City of Bangladesh, the Bangladesh Sericulture Development Board (In Bengali : Jatio Resham Board) is situated at Rajshahi. There are seven silk factories in the BSCIC Industrial Town in Rajshahi. Also an Inter-City train is named Silk City express after Rajshahi. The train communicates from Rajshahi to Dhaka, the capital city of Bangladesh. Rajshahi is notable in Bangladesh for producing Mango and Silk.

Points of interest
 Bagdhani Mosque
 Bagha Mosque
 Kismat Maria Mosque
 Tomb of Shah Makhdum
 Tomb of Shah Sultan
 Talando Shiv Mandir
 Puthia Temple Complex
 Boro Kuthi

See also
 Districts of Bangladesh
 Faridpur District
 Rajbari District

Notes

References

 
Districts of Bangladesh
Districts of Bangladesh established before 1971